Hugh Martin CH (born 7 April 1890 in Glasgow; died 2 July 1964 in East Grinstead) was a British Christian student leader, active in the ecumenical movement, and a publisher whose SCM Press brought out many theological books. A Baptist who was trained for the ministry and who edited their 1962 Hymn Book, he was deeply involved in the ecumenical movement, working for Christian student bodies, the British Council of Churches, and to promote reconstruction in Europe following World War II. He was awarded the Order of the Companions of Honour in 1955.

Education
He was born in 1890, son of a Baptist minister.  He studied at Glasgow Academy and the Royal Technical College, Glasgow. At the University of Glasgow, he won the Henderson biblical prize in 1913. He then studied theology at Baptist Theological College of Scotland, where he was awarded the Baptist Union scholarship for the highest marks.

Student Christians
He seemed set for a career in the Baptist ministry, being placed on the probationary list of ministers in 1914, and the main list in 1920. However, he chose to work with students, and in 1914 became assistant secretary of the Student Christian Movement, in charge of the organisation's publications. He was treasurer of the World Student Christian Federation from 1928 to 1935.

Publishing
In 1929 he founded SCM Press as a separate company, based on the existing publications department of the Student Christian Movement. In 1937 they founded the Religious Book Club which soon had 18,000 members. Following a break due to the war, he became managing director of SCM Press in 1943.

Wartime service
During World War II he served in the Ministry of Information, in the religious division.

Later work
In 1943 he became Free Church leader of the British Council of Churches. Following World War II, he served on the committee of Christian Reconstruction in Europe. He was Moderator of the National Free Church Federal Council.

Hymn book
He edited The Baptist Hymn Book, 1962, published by the Psalms and Trust, having persuaded the Trustees to go for  awholly new book rather than a revision, and co-wrote the Baptist Hymn Book Companion (1962).

Honours
He became a member of the Order of the Companions of Honour in 1955.

Works
The Beatitudes
The Lord's Prayer
Luke's Portrait of Jesus
The Meaning of the Old Testament
The Parables of the Gospel
Puritanism and Richard Baxter, SCM, London, 1954

References

British publishers (people)
20th-century Scottish Baptist ministers
Clergy from Glasgow
Members of the Order of the Companions of Honour
1890 births
1964 deaths